Road routes in New South Wales assist drivers navigating roads throughout the state, as roads may change names several times between destinations, or have a second local name in addition to a primary name. New South Wales previously used an older, numerical shield-based system (which this article focuses on) until 2013, when it was completely replaced (except for Tourist Routes) with a newer, alphanumeric system.

New South Wales implemented the federally-issued National Routes system between 1954 and 1955, using white-and-black shields highlighting interstate links between major regional centres; some of these routes were later upgraded into National Highways using green-and-gold shields when the National Roads Act was passed in 1974.

Sydney's initial shield system was the Ring Road system, with three routes rolled out in 1964. These were eventually replaced by a specialised Freeway Routes system in 1973, and a state-wide shield-based numbering scheme, allocating blue-and-white shields across Sydney in 1974, numbered to fit around existing National Routes, with separate allocations for rural New South Wales, the Hunter (Greater Newcastle) and Illawarra (Greater Wollongong) regions; this system received sporadic updates throughout the 1990s and 2000s. These were augmented by the Metroad system in 1992-3, with its blue-on-white hexagonal shields identifying major routes through Sydney, with additional routes added through the late 1990s.

The new alphanumeric system, introduced in 2013, has now replaced the previous scheme across the entire state. It consists of alphanumeric routes, a one-to-three digit number prefixed with a letter (M, A, B, or D) that denotes the grade and importance of the road, and (apart from Tourist Routes) is now the state's only road route numbering system.

Some routes, in part or in their entirety, may have been made obsolete by the alphanumeric designation: these replacement routes are noted but not listed in full here. Some also may follow older alignments or routes later changed even after the new system was introduced, and are included here for the sake of completion. Roads are described in either a west-east or north–south alignment.

National Routes
National Routes were the first type of route numbering to be attempted in Australia on a large scale, signed with a white shield and black writing (similar in shape to the shield that appears on the Australian coat of arms), with New South Wales receiving routes in 1954. They highlighted the interstate links connecting major population, industrial and principal regions of New South Wales to the rest of the Australia, in a way that was readily identifiable to interstate travellers. The system was prepared by COSRA (Conference of State Road Authorities), held between 1953-4: once each state road authority agreed to the scheme, it was rolled out federally.

In 1954, the Hume Highway was trialled as National Route 31, chosen due to its prominence as a transport corridor connecting Australia's largest cities (Sydney and Melbourne). Soon after, other National Routes across the state were allocated. Selected routes were later upgraded into National Highways when the National Roads Act was passed in 1974.

New South Wales' National Routes were initially replaced within the boundaries of Sydney with the Metroad system in 1992-3, and eventually replaced entirely across the state by the alphanumeric system in 2013: each route was converted to an alphanumeric route number, rendering the previous shields redundant. Many National Routes across New South Wales were renumbered during the conversion, while some others were not replaced at all and became unsigned.

National Highways
With the passing of the National Roads Act in 1974, selected National Routes were further upgraded to the status of a National Highway: interstate roads linking Australia's capital cities and major regional centres that received federal funding, and were of higher importance than other National Routes. These new routes were symbolised by green shields with gold writing, and the word "National" along the top of the shield. Most of New South Wales' National Highways were declared in 1974 and their shields converted in the following years, with National Highways 20 and 39 later declared in 1992.

Like National Routes, New South Wales' National Highways were also replaced with the alphanumeric system, introduced across the state in 2013: each route was converted to an alphanumeric route number, with all keeping their number during the conversion.

Metroads
These routes, characterised by their blue and white hexagonal shields, were phased in across Sydney between 1992-3, better highlighting major routes into and around the city. A total of 9 routes existed, numbered from 1 to 10, covering Sydney's major radial and circumferential arteries. Metroad 4 was fully signed in December 1992, and Metroads 1, 2, 3, 5 and 7 followed in 1993. A second stage was rolled out a few years later: Metroads 9 and 10 were added in 1998, and Metroad 6 was added in 1999; there was no Metroad 8. These were eventually replaced with the alphanumeric system, introduced across the state in 2013: each route was converted to an alphanumeric route number, keeping their number during the conversion (with the exception of Metroad 10, which became A8).

State Routes 
After planning by the Department of Main Roads, the State Route system - a new route numbering system across the state of New South Wales - was introduced in 1974. The route numbering scheme was symbolised by blue rounded shields with white writing - much like the Freeway Routes, except without the red crests - with focus points in Sydney, Newcastle, and Wollongong. They were allocated to fit around the existing National Routes system and Sydney's Freeway Routes, and to also replace Sydney's existing Ring Roads, marking out urban arterial routes and secondary rural highways. The system had two minor updates when Metroads were introduced across Sydney (in 1992-3, and again in 1998-9), and received sporadic updates (mostly route decommissioning) in the years following.

They were allocated as follows:
 11, 33 and 55: Respectively replaced Ring Roads 1, 3 and 5. In 1988, State Route 77 was commissioned as an additional primary circumferential route;
 11-77: Greater Sydney. Even numbers were for radial routes in and out of the city, while odd numbers were circumferential around the city, roughly increasing in value anticlockwise around Sydney. Exceptions were State Route 31 (which replaced Metroad 5 when the South Western Motorway was extended east) and State Route 60 (which is in Wollongong). Routes 36, 40, 56, 68 and 69 extended beyond the bounds of Greater Sydney;
 78-99: Rural New South Wales. Due to a far larger area of coverage and no focal cities, east-west routes were to be even-numbered, while north-south routes were to be odd-numbered;
 111, 121-124, 128, 131-133, 135: Hunter region. Like Sydney, even numbers were for radial routes into and out of Newcastle, while odd numbers were circumferential around Newcastle;
 151, 153, 155 and 157: Illawarra region. Like Sydney, even numbers were for radial routes into and out of Wollongong, while odd numbers were circumferential around Wollongong;
 2: In 2008, Queensland's State Route 2 from the Gold Coast was extended a short distance into far northern NSW and remains the only official state route.

State Routes were eventually replaced by the alphanumeric system in 2013; as many had been decommissioned beforehand, very few survived to be converted into an alphanumeric route number. Those converted in rural areas usually kept their number; some in Greater Sydney were renumbered during the conversion, while most were not replaced at all and became unsigned.

Sydney

Rural New South Wales

Hunter region

Illawarra region

Freeway Routes
A new system, specifically designed for freeways in New South Wales, was introduced in 1973. They were symbolised by blue rounded shields with white writing crowned by red crests, in an imitation of the American Interstate shield. Planning, and resulting land reservation, for these freeways had already been made by the Department of Main Roads in 1951 (with the exception of the F2, which was planned later in 1967), and signage on existing roads in these reservations was rolled out between 1973-4; while extensions or freeway segments were signed as they opened throughout the 1970s, signage became neglected during the 1980s and subsequent extensions to existing signed Freeways Routes were rarely marked (particularly since plans and construction of many of the proposed freeways were cancelled by the state government in 1977). Eight routes were planned, but only five were ever signed. The system was never officially decommissioned, but virtually all signage was removed when Metroads were introduced in 1992.

Ring Roads
The Ring Roads system was introduced in 1964 as a way to highlight major routes around Sydney (on circumferential routes), complimenting the existing National Route system (which were all radial routes into and out of Sydney). Ring Roads carried a blue and white circular shield with a dotted outline. Three Ring Roads were proclaimed, but this system lasted for only 10 years before being replaced by the State Routes system in 1974.

References 

 
Road routes
New South Wales
Road routes